The Vatra i barut Tour is the worldwide concert tour by Bosnian singer Zdravko Čolić, in support of his fourteenth studio album, Vatra i barut. It began on March 8, 2014, in Malmö, Sweden at the Amiralen and is continuing throughout Europe, Australia, USA and Canada. It will finish in December 2017
The tour also includes some festival concerts.

Shows

References

External links
Zdravko Čolić Official Website

2014 concert tours
2015 concert tours